The Salem County Vocational Technical Schools (SCVTS) is a countywide vocational and technical public school district, serving the educational needs of residents of Salem County, New Jersey, United States. The district offers programs on both a full-time and shared-time basis in cooperation and partnership with the county's elementary and secondary schools, local and regional colleges and universities, for both school-aged students and adults.

As of the 2014-15 school year, the district and its one school had an enrollment of 738 students and 43.5 classroom teachers (on an FTE basis), for a student–teacher ratio of 17.0:1.

Schools
Schools in the district (with 2014-15 enrollment data from the National Center for Education Statistics) are:
Salem County Career and Technical High School offering 14 career and technical education programs (738 students; in grades 9-12).

Administration
Core members of the district's administration are:
John R. Swain, Superintendent
John Bolil, Business Administrator / Board Secretary.

References

External links
Salem County Vocational Technical Schools
Salem County Vocational Technical Schools overview

Data for the Salem County Vocational Technical Schools, National Center for Education Statistics

School districts in Salem County, New Jersey
Vocational school districts in New Jersey
Woodstown, New Jersey